The ninth series of the children's television series Hi-5 aired between 11 June 2007 and 10 August 2007 on the Nine Network in Australia. The series was produced by Kids Like Us for Nine with Helena Harris as executive producer. 

This was the first series to feature Sun Park, replacing Kathleen de Leon Jones, who makes three guest appearances throughout the series. It was also the last series to feature Tim Harding.

Production
Prior to production of the ninth series of Hi-5 in 2006, Kathleen de Leon Jones announced that she was pregnant, and that she would take maternity leave from the Hi-5 group from April onwards. de Leon Jones had previously been involved in the filming of the eighth series, which did not air until June, after she had departed. Sun Park was introduced as her temporary replacement, while de Leon Jones gave birth to her first child in July. Park took de Leon Jones' place for the group's touring, and production of the ninth series in 2006.

The ninth series premiered on 11 June 2007, with de Leon Jones making a guest appearance to announce her pregnancy and introduce Park to viewers. She made two further appearances throughout the series, including one return along with her daughter. de Leon Jones stated that it was important to explain her pregnancy to the young audience, and show that "she [hadn't] just disappeared". Park added, "it comforts [children] to know that Kathleen has passed that trust down to me". Creator and executive producer Helena Harris stated that by 2007, "Hi-5 [was] still evolving and maintaining its relevance and freshness". Kellie Crawford, Nathan Foley, Tim Harding and Charli Robinson all returned for the series.

While de Leon Jones initially stated that she was intent on returning to Hi-5, she later made the decision to permanently leave the group to focus on being a mother. Park took her place as a permanent member with the group, during the airing of the ninth series in 2007. The ninth series was also the last to feature Tim Harding, who departed from the group later in the year.

Cast

Presenters
 Kellie Crawford – Word Play
 Nathan Foley – Shapes in Space
 Tim Harding – Making Music
 Sun Park – Puzzles and Patterns
 Charli Robinson  – Body Move

Guest
 Kathleen de Leon Jones

Episodes

Home video releases

Awards and nominations

Notes

References

External links
 Hi-5 Website

2007 Australian television seasons